Alfa Romeo III (also known as Shockwave) is a  "mini-maxi" built to compete with other boats of the same size in shorter distance races under IRC rules.

As Alfa Romeo I and Alfa Romeo II, she was also designed by Reichel/Pugh and built by McConaghy Boats; Her  mast was also built by Southern Spars. She has a conventional fixed bulb keel and was launched in mid-2008. Her interior design is styled after the Alfa Romeo 8C Competizione, in red, silver/gray, black and white, with a companionway ladder which resembles the car's grill. The IRC Mini Maxi division accommodates yachts between  LOA. In September 2008, she was twice first to finish in Maxi Yacht Rolex Cup competition, with Torben Grael skippering.

Though her LOA is about  shorter than Alfa Romeo II, her beam is comparable, to enhance stiffness, or resistance to heeling, and she carries a long bowsprit from which she sets an asymmetrical spinnaker. With this "mini-Maxi" Crichton sought closer competition on the race course. He noted that with only perhaps ten of the supermaxi yachts (potential competitors of Alfa Romeo II) in existence, getting them all on the same race course at the same time had been difficult. The more affordable mini-Maxi engages more competition in stronger fleets. She has since been bought by George Sakellaris.

Shockwave took line honors by completing the 635 nm 2014 Bermuda Race in a time of time was 63h 04m 11s. The win adds to Shockwaves list of victories, including a division win in the 2012 Bermuda Race, the 2013 Montego Bay, and the 2014 RORC Caribbean 600 Race.

Sponsorship
Alfa Romeo III was sponsored by Alfa Romeo Automobiles S.p.A. of Turin, Italy. They own the Alfa Romeo name and other intellectual properties such as logos, emblems (used on Alfa Romeo III), and manner of depicting the name as shown on the mainsail of Alfa Romeo II in the infobox.

See also
Alfa Romeo I
Alfa Romeo II
Wild Oats XI

References

External links
Alfa Romeo Yacht Racing Team site
Alfa Romeo Yacht Racing Team news releases
Alfa Romeo II build details
2009 Transpac race crew list
Maxi Yacht Rolex Cup Victory in Sardinia
Giraglia Rolex Cup promotional information
Alfa Romeo II demonstrating speed at Malta Rolex Middle Sea Race 2006
Deck layout and detail photos of Alfa Romeo II

Ships built in New South Wales
Individual sailing vessels
2000s sailing yachts
Alfa Romeo
Sydney to Hobart Yacht Race yachts
Sailing yachts designed by Reichel/Pugh
Sailing yachts built in Australia
Sailboat types built by McConaghy Boats